Magroor is a 1979 Hindi-language film directed by Brij. It stars Shatrughan Sinha and Vidya Sinha.

Cast
Shatrughan Sinha ... Ranjit Sinha / Raju 
Vidya Sinha ... Anju 
Premnath ... Mama 
Shreeram Lagoo ... Chacha 
Deven Verma ... Lallu
Helen ... Rukhsana 
Jagdish Raj ... Police Officer
Nadira ... Mrs. Disa 
Paintal ... Rakesh (Anju's Brother)

Soundtrack
Lyrics: Anand Bakshi

External links
 

1979 films
1970s Hindi-language films
Films scored by Laxmikant–Pyarelal
Films directed by Brij Sadanah